Loyoro may refer to
 Loyoro, Uganda, a community in the Kaabong District of Uganda
 Loyoro, South Sudan, a community in Eastern Equatoria state of South Sudan
 Loyoro River, a river in Eastern Equatoria state of South Sudan